A copycat crime is a criminal act that is modelled after or inspired by a previous crime. It notably occurs after exposure to media content depicted said crimes, and/or a live criminal model.

Copycat effect
The copycat effect is the alleged tendency of sensational publicity about violent murders or suicides to result in more of the same through imitation.

The term was first coined in the early 20th century, following crimes inspired  by Jack the Ripper. Due to the increase of replicated crimes, criminologists soon began to believe that media coverage played a role in inspiring other criminals to commit crimes in a similar fashion, and even for non-criminals to begin committing crimes when they otherwise might not have done so.

A book written by Loren Coleman called The Copycat Effect describes the effect that the media has on crimes and suicides, which are inspired by crimes that have been widely covered across the media. Coleman's view on the media is that the constant coverage of these events, rather than the events with a positive message, gives these criminals a type of fame. The five minutes of fame, book or movie that is dedicated to these criminals provokes other individuals with a tendency to behave in a similar way. Due to this type of fame, the "copycat effect" takes place.

The US documentary television series CopyCat Killers investigates murders that appear to be based on Hollywood films.

Examples 
Various criminal acts have been inspired by many television shows, movies, books as well as other criminals. A list of a few crimes that have been a result of the copycat effect are:

Television series

Breaking Bad 
The television show Breaking Bad has been suspected of inspiring a number of crimes. The series depicts a high school chemistry teacher with cancer who begins making and selling drugs to obtain money for securing his family's financial future. A few crimes include the following:

In Kansas City, Missouri, police found in 2010 the dealing of blue colored methamphetamine that seemed to be inspired by Walter White's meth.
A 27-year-old man, Jason Hart, was found guilty of strangling his girlfriend to death, and then used sulfuric acid in a plastic tub to dispose of the body. The incident had many similarities to various scenes in Breaking Bad, where White and Jesse Pinkman dispose of bodies in a similar fashion. It was later found out that he had been a fan of Breaking Bad.                                            
Stephen W. Doran, a teacher, and a former member of the Massachusetts House of Representatives from 1981 to 1995, was arrested in 2013 for methamphetamine trafficking when police found $10,000 in cash, as well as equipment. He appeared in court with a clean-shaven head, and it was later found that he had been battling with cancer. He had been inspired by the television show to take things into his own hands and earn cash so he could receive the surgery/therapy he needed.

Dexter
In Canada, Mark Twitchell was arrested in 2008 after attempting the murder of one man, then completing the murder of another. He was convicted of the latter crime only in 2011, but he documented his efforts to become a serial killer and is a fan of the television show Dexter.

Films 

Scream: A 24-year-old man, Thierry Jaradin, stabbed a young girl, Alisson Cambier, 30 times; similar to the way the victim was stabbed in the movie. He had been wearing the Ghostface costume, and later confessed that he had planned the murder in a similar way to the movie. 
Fight Club: There have been many incidents inspired by the movie. One of the incidents occurred in 2009 during the Memorial Day weekend in New York City. Bombs were set off in various locations supposedly representing their oppression. Kyle Shaw was found guilty, and was himself a member of the local fight club.
Saw: In Salt Lake City two teenage boys were turned in after being overheard planning the kidnapping, torture, and murder of several individuals who in their estimation needed to be taught a lesson. The pair had set up cameras so as to record their killings. In Tennessee, two girls were charged with phone harassment after leaving a 52-year-old woman voicemail stating they had taken possession of her friend, were about to release a toxic gas, and the voicemail recipient had to choose between risking her own life to save her friend's or let her friend die.
The Dark Knight: The movie's depiction of the Joker has inspired several crimes. In 2010, a Wisconsin man assaulted his cousin and girlfriend, dressed as the Joker, when he found them sleeping together. In 2009, a young girl attacked her teacher with a razor blade. Her face had been painted in a similar way to the Joker. The 2012 Aurora, Colorado shooting, which took place during a screening of the film's sequel, is often mistaken for a Joker copycat crime due to misinformation in early reporting.
 Taxi Driver: The 1976 film inspired John Hinckley Jr.'s attempt to assassinate Ronald Reagan in 1981. The main character in the film comes close to assassinating a presidential candidate, and Hinckley was driven by an intense obsession with Jodie Foster, who was part of the film's cast.
 Several movies, including Basic Instinct, American Psycho, Casablanca and Catch Me If You Can, inspired Luka Magnotta to commit the 2012 murder of Concordia University student Jun Lin. Magnotta recorded the murder of the student whom he had recently met on Craigslist and also posted the video online. On the video, New Order's "True Faith" can be heard playing in the background, which can also be heard in American Psycho. Jun Lin was stabbed multiple times while being tied up on bed, in the same way that Johnny Boz was tied up on Basic Instinct's main character Catherine's bed. One item Magnotta used to murder Jun Lin was a screwdriver, which was painted white to make it look like the ice pick Catherine used to kill Johnny Boz. Above the bed, Magnotta carefully hung a poster of the movie Casablanca, which he threw away after the murder. After the murder, Magnotta fled to Paris (which is also an important location in Casablanca), claiming that an individual named Manny forced him first to kill cats and then Jun Lin; Manny was the name of Catherine's fiancé in Basic Instinct. In 2014 Magnotta was captured in Berlin and flown back to Canada. While in Europe, Magnotta used a false passport in the name of Kirk Trammel, which is another reference to Basic Instinct's main character Catherine Trammel. On the footage of the interrogation, Magnotta sits cross-legged while smoking a cigarette to complete his homage to Basic Instinct. Around 2010, when Magnotta first started uploading videos online of him killing kittens, he used different aliases and accounts. On one account, he posted the movie Catch Me If You Can, in which Leonardo DiCaprio is on the run from the FBI.

Criminals 

Zodiac Killer: In the late 1960s, near San Francisco, an unidentified man murdered at least five victims and wounded two more, also sending taunting letters and codes to the media. Twenty years later Eddie Seda attacked victims in a similar manner in New York City, killing his victims with a homemade gun. He left similar notes at the scene of the crime, and also sent cryptic letters to the police. Unlike the Zodiac Killer, Seda was eventually caught because of the fingerprints that he had left behind on the notes.
Jack the Ripper: In 2008, Derek Brown, 48, was found guilty of killing two young women in a similar way as the Ripper. He had targeted the two women, one a prostitute and the other a street vendor, because he believed that the two would not have been noticed missing. The two bodies were never found, but it is said that he may have dismembered the women in his bathtub and later disposed of the bodies. 
Murder-suicide: Murder-suicides have inspired many notable mass shootings, in which the killer goes on a shooting rampage before shooting themselves. There have been a wide range of similar cases that include many school shootings, work rampages etc. 
Chicago Tylenol murders: In 1982, seven people had died after taking the over-the-counter Tylenol after it had been laced with cyanide. Deaths in a similar fashion occurred a few years later. A woman was found dead after she had taken two Tylenol pills which had also been laced with cyanide. In another case, a woman was found guilty of tampering with Excedrin, which caused the death of two individuals, as well as her husband.
Dunblane massacre: On March 13, 1996, Thomas Hamilton, 43, killed 16 children and one teacher at Dunblane Primary School before committing suicide. On April 28 of that same year, Martin Bryant committed another mass shooting at Port Arthur in Tasmania, killing 35 people and injuring 23 before his arrest. According to his lawyer, Bryant was motivated in large part by media coverage of the Dunblane shooting, particularly the attention given to the perpetrator.
The Columbine High School massacre has inspired numerous copycat crimes, among those were Seung Hui Cho's 2007 Virginia Tech Massacre, Adam Lanza's 2012 Sandy Hook Elementary shooting, and Nicolas Cruz's 2018 Marjory Stoneman High Shooting. The first copycat crime, The W.R. Myers High School shooting was allegedly inspired by the pair who committed the shooting.
Vladimir Ionesyan: Between 2014 and 2015, Anushervon Rakhmanov murdered seven people in Moscow, Russia in a manner resembling Ionesyan's. He would even use the same method as the former to enter each victim's house: by presenting himself as an employee of Mosgaz who was sent to check the pipes.
Lam Kor-wan: after watching a videotape covering his crimes, habitual thief Luo Shubiao, who had committed a murder in 1977 but was not apprehended for it at the time, committed 18 copycat murders in Guangzhou, China from 1990 to 1994. The Chinese press even gave him the exact same nickname as Lam: "The Rainy Night Butcher".

Fictional examples 
Fictional series can reference the concept of copycat crimes.
Friday the 13th Part V: A New Beginning: Roy Burns uses the evidences of the main antagonist of most of the films Jason Voorhees to become a spree killer just like Jason himself as well as the latter's mother Pamela from the original film to kill everyone at Pinehurst which housed patients with all many kinds of disorders after he was devastated from seeing his son Joey killed by an annoyed Vic.
Quick Change: After Bill Murray's character robs a bank while wearing a clown costume, a policewoman (Davinia McFadden) reports that "two liquor stores and a laundromat were hit by copycat clowns" several hours after Murray and his accomplices escaped.
Detention: Sander committed serial killings in Grizzly Lake inspired by a horror movie Cinderhella and was disguised as such idol character, which brought the manager to confine the group of pupils who searched for him before being killed by Sander himself. Sander was actually killed when he grabbed Riley Jones while the company managed to lure him into the time machine after revealing his identity to them.
Hotline Miami 2: Wrong Number: In this game, the characters "The Fans" are inspired by Jacket's killing sprees from the first game and become spree killers just like Jacket. They have many phones set up, but don't realize that the Russian mafia boss, the one in charge of the phone calls, was killed by Jacket in the first game. Because of this, they find out about odd jobs from friends and the news before ultimately dying to the son of the Russian mafia boss.

Causes

It has been shown that most of the people who mimic crimes seen in the media (especially news and violent movies) have in most cases prior criminal records, prior severe mental health problems or histories of violence. This suggests that the effect of the media is indirect (more affecting criminal behaviour) rather than direct (directly affecting the number of criminals). However, that indirect influence that the media has on the individual might give them the idea of how to commit a crime. The type of reaction that the media coverage gives crimes can determine the path another criminal might take. This is because most copycat criminals are intent on the shock value of their actions. They want to do something that will cause a high media coverage because of the attention that they will get, as well as the horror a crime may create. If going on a shooting rampage in a public space causes this attention (because of previous incidents), then an individual with the tendency to commit the crime will more likely take that path.

The norms, heroes, anti-heroes and the spectacles of the time and place also influence how a crime is committed. In today's society, dressing up as one's favorite villain, and going to a public place armed, is what some decide to do. Sometimes individuals replicate their favorite movie or TV show scene. Conversely, before modern media, for example in the Middle Ages, crimes might be associated with the devil, snakes, or witches. But in both scenarios, it is the public interest that sparks what crime might be committed.

Some researchers hold the view that the interaction between violent media content and the emotional development of an individual play a role in copycat behaviors. Individuals who are less emotionally developed will more likely commit the crimes that they see on TV. Characteristics such as demographic (age and sex), criminal factors (mental/personality disorders, failure in human bonding/lack of identity, social isolation and alienation) and relationship to media (trust in media, media literacy, identification with the perpetrators seen in media), mixed with media characteristics and cultural-environment factors influences the copycat behavior in individuals. Media characteristics include the blur between fantasy and reality, positive response to violence and crime and how the crime is being committed. Cultural-environmental factors include the cultural view of fame and crime, reliance to the media for information and moral panics. Offenders most likely be influenced by these characteristics are usually under the age of 25. However, these claims are an object of an ongoing debate in research on the effects of violence in mass media.

Prevention
American cryptozoologist Loren Coleman and author Zeynep Tufekci have suggested that copycat crimes can be prevented through a number of means, including: the use of carefully selected, non-sensationalistic language on the part of law enforcement and the media when communicating news of crimes to the public; avoiding the release of details on both the methods of crimes and the name of any suspects; avoiding the perpetuation of cliches and stereotypes about criminals and the causes of their behavior; emphasis on the effect of the crimes on the victims and their loved ones; and including protective factors like helplines when publishing stories on such crimes.

See also 
 Attack the Gas Station, a 1999 film that inspired copycat crimes 
 Copycat, a 1995 film about a copycat serial killer
 Copycat suicide
 Scream, a 1996 film that inspired several copycat killers
 Crime mapping
 Fear of crime
 Gun violence
 Mass shooting contagion
 Hate crime
 Heriberto Seda (born 1967), a serial killer in New York, known as the "Copycat Zodiac Killer"
 Insanity defense
 Sex crime
 Social policy
 Victimology
 The Following, a 2012 TV series about copycat crimes
 Ghost in the Shell: Stand Alone Complex, an animated television series where police are investigating a string of copycat crimes inspired by "The Laughing Man"

References

External links 
Copycat Crimes

Crime by type
Forensic psychology
Forensic psychiatry
Criminology
Journalism ethics
Influence of mass media